Monserrate Sanctuary is a Catholic shrine in Bogotá, Colombia.

See also 

 Monserrate, the mountain on which the church is located

References

External links 

 Cerro de Monserrate

Buildings and structures in Bogotá
Religious buildings and structures in Colombia
Roman Catholic shrines in Colombia
Tourist attractions in Bogotá
Basilica churches in Colombia
Roman Catholic churches in Bogotá